VCM-01 ("VCM" likely stands for "Vietnamese Cruise Missile") is a family of Vietnamese subsonic anti-surface cruise missiles that is being developed by the Viettel Aerospace Institute (VTX). Little information has been officially and publicly revealed by Viettel or any parts of the Vietnam Ministry of National Defence; however, according to many pictures and pieces of information shared in the media, VCM-01 is likely developed and derived from the Russian Kh-35 anti-ship missile, which is currently the backbone anti-ship missiles operated by the Vietnam People's Navy.

Development and Operational history

First appearance 
In 2019, the first picture of a missile designated as VCM-01 missile was made public. The model was unveiled on a television show showing that the new missile was identical to the Kh-35, and information printed on the model's body showed that Z189 Shipyard was also engaged in the development of the missile. Z189 has been the local manufacturer for the KT-184 launcher for the Vietnam People's Navy Kh-35E missiles, so it is likely that Z189 will also produce the launchers and the outer shell of the VCM-01 missiles.

In late 2021, the VCM-01 missile appeared once more time in another television show, indirectly confirmed that the missile will be assembled by the M3 Communication Company (now merged into the Viettel Manufacturing Corporation), which is a unit of the Viettel Group.

Test fires 
According to the Vietnamese authorities' documents ordering prohibitions on some specific coastal areas in 2018, VCM-01 is test-fired for at least twice. Once was in Quỳnh Lưu District, Nghệ An Province and another once was in Tiền Hải District, Thái Bình Province. No further information was announced or reported by the local authorities as well as Viettel, including the results of those activities and the existence of any other test fires besides those mentioned.

Engine 
In 2020, Vietnam and South Korea entered negotiations for the delivery of the South Korean SSE-750K turbojet engines to Vietnam, presumably for the VCM-01 project. This is the engine used in South Korea's SSM-710K Haeseong anti-ship missile, as well as its tactical land-attack variant SSM-750K Sea Dragon. It is unconfirmed if Vietnam chose this type of engine for its VCM-01 project or if Vietnam would make another engine choice, such as the Moto Sich MS400 turbofan engines powering the Ukrainian Neptune anti-ship missile. However, Vietnam is believed to likely choose the South Korean-made engine for the project, as the Korean partners are said being ready to assist and transfer the engine technologies to Vietnam, which made the deal more attractive and reasonable.

Confusion with the "KCT-15" project 
Many Vietnamese and international sources (including SIPRI) believe that "KCT-15" was a Vietnamese project to copy or assemble the Kh-35E/UE anti-ship missile as an effort to improve self-reliance on the supply and technological mastery of armaments for the Vietnam People's Navy as well as the entire People's Army of Vietnam. Another media source believes that KCT-15 was the old designation of the VCM-01 development project before it was taken over and redesignated as VCM-01 by VTX. However, "KCT-15" was never a designation for any missile development project undertaken by Vietnam or Viettel, and in fact, the prefix "KCT" is used to designate a set of projects in a program to study and master the operation and maintenance of the Kh-35 missiles used by the Vietnam People's Navy. "KCT-15" is known as the fifteenth project in the KCT program to master the operation of the Kh-35 missile, and the confusion may have arisen when the media took a picture of a Kh-35 look-alike model with the "KCT-15" designation, leading people to mistakenly believe that it was a Vietnamese project to locally produce the Kh-35 missiles; however, that model would be only used for training and studying purposes and it has little relationship with the project carried out by Viettel.

See also 

The VCM-01 anti-ship missile is comparable and influenced by:

 Kh-35 Uran
 SSM-710K Haeseong
 R-360 Neptune
 RGM-84 Harpoon
 MM40 Exocet
 YJ-83/C-802 variants

References 

Cruise missiles